The Women's compound team event took place on 7 October 2010 at the Yamuna Sports Complex.

Teams
Eight teams participated in the competition:

Results

References
 Reports

Archery at the 2010 Commonwealth Games
Common